The list of shipwrecks in 1937 includes ships sunk, foundered, grounded, or otherwise lost during 1937.

January

1 January

2 January

3 January

6 January

7 January

9 January

11 January

12 January

13 January

14 January

16 January

17 January

18 January

19 January

20 January

21 January

23 January

24 January

25 January

26 January

27 January

28 January

29 January

30 January

Unknown date

February

1 February

2 February

3 February

7 February

8 February

10 February

11 February

12 February

13 February

14 February

15 February

16 February

17 February

18 February

25 February

28 February

Unknown date

March

1 March

4 March

5 March

6 March

7 March

8 March

10 March

14 March

16 March

18 March

20 March

22 March

24 March

25 March

27 March

28 March

29 March

30 March

Unknown date

April

2 April

4 April

6 April

7 April

9 April

10 April

12 April

13 April

23 April

24 April

25 April

26 April

28 April

29 April

30 April

May

1 May

2 May

3 May

7 May

8 May

9 May

10 May

12 May

13 May

14 May

15 May

16 May

17 May

18 May

20 May

21 May

23 May

26 May

28 May

30 May

June

1 June

5 June

6 June

7 June

8 June

10 June

11 June

12 June

13 June

14 June

15 June

16 June

17 June

18 June

19 June

22 June

25 June

26 June

29 June

30 June

Unknown date

July

2 July

3 July

4 July

8 July

9 July

11 July

12 July

13 July

14 July

15 July

16 July

17 July

18 July

20 July

21 July

22 July

24 July

27 July

29 July

30 July

August

1 August

2 August

3 August

5 August

7 August

8 August

9 August

10 August

11 August

12 August

13 August

14 August

15 August

17 August

18 August

25 August

26 August

27 August

28 August

29 August

30 August

31 August

Unknown date

September

1 September

2 September

7 September

9 September

11 September

13 September

15 September

16 September

17 September

18 September

20 September

21 September

22 September

23 September

24 September

25 September

26 September

27 September

28 September

29 September

30 September

Unknown date

October

1 October

2 October

3 October

4 October

5 October

7 October

8 October

9 October

10 October

12 October

13 October

14 October

15 October

16 October

17 October

19 October

20 October

21 October

23 October

24 October

25 October

26 October

27 October

29 October

30 October

31 October

Unknown date

November

1 November

4 November

5 November

7 November

8 November

9 November

10 November

11 November

12 November

13 November

14 November

17 November

18 November

19 November

21 November

22 November

24 November

25 November

26 November

27 November

28 November

29 November

30 November

December

2 December

3 December

7 December

10 December

11 December

12 December

13 December

15 December

16 December

17 December

23 December

24 December

25 December

26 December

28 December

29 December

31 December

Unknown date

References

 
1937
Ships